"Miss Me Baby" is a song co-written and recorded by American country music artist Chris Cagle. It was released in June 2005 as the first single from his album Anywhere but Here.  It peaked at number 12 on the Hot Country Songs chart.  The song was written by Cagle and Monty Powell.

The commercial single release had Kenny Rogers' "I Can't Unlove You" on the b-side.

Music video
The music video was directed by Eric Welch. It was filmed entirely on location in the Mojave Desert in California. The whole video is him performing the song with his band, mixed in with a few solo shots of him walking.

Chart performance
"Miss Me Baby" debuted at number 56 on the U.S. Billboard Hot Country Singles & Tracks chart for the week of June 25, 2005.

References

2005 singles
2005 songs
Chris Cagle songs
Songs written by Chris Cagle
Songs written by Monty Powell
Capitol Records Nashville singles